Sir Humphrey Monoux, 4th Baronet (c. 1702–1757) of Wootton House, Bedfordshire, was a British landowner and Tory politician who sat in the House of Commons from 1728 to 1741

Monoux was the only son of Sir Philip Monoux, 3rd Baronet, MP, and his wife Dorothy Harvey, daughter of William Harvey of Chigwell, Essex. He succeeded his father to the baronetcy on 25 November 1707. He matriculated at Trinity College, Oxford on 19 February 1720, aged 17 and was created MA on 3 May 1723.

At the 1727 British general election. Monoux stood as a Tory in a contest for Bedfordshire, and was defeated. He was returned at a by-election on 24 February 1728 as Member of Parliament for Tavistock, by his neighbour, Wriothesley Russell, 3rd Duke of Bedford. He voted consistently against the Government. At the 1734 British general election, he was returned by the Duke of Marlborough for Stockbridge apparently in exchange for providing his electoral interest at Bedfordshire for the Duke's brother John Spencer. Monoux continued to vote against the Government and did not stand again at the 1741 British general election,

Monoux married Jane Elizabeth Jones, widow of Charles Wake Jones of Waltham Abbey, Essex, and daughter of Sir Samuel Vanacker Sambrooke, 3rd Baronet on 11 December 1742. He died without issue on 3 December 1757.

References

1700s births
1757 deaths
British MPs 1727–1734
British MPs 1734–1741
Members of the Parliament of Great Britain for Tavistock
Baronets in the Baronetage of England